Hajnalka is a Hungarian feminine given name originating from the 19th century. It is made up of the word hajnal ("dawn") and the diminutive suffix -ka. It may refer to:

 Hajnalka Sipos (1972-), Hungarian footballer
 Hajnalka Futaki (1990-), Hungarian handball player
 Hajnalka Juhász (1980-), Hungarian politician
 Hajnalka Tóth (1976-), Hungarian fencer
 Hajnalka Kiraly-Picot (1971-), Hungarian fencer

References 

Hungarian feminine given names
Feminine given names